Acrocercops guttiferella is a moth of the family Gracillariidae, known from Madagascar. It was described by Pierre Viette in 1951. The larvae feed on a Guttiferae species.

References

guttiferella
Moths of Madagascar
Moths described in 1951